Thomas Ebner (born 17 November 1971) is an Austrian middle-distance runner. He competed in the men's 1500 metres at the 1996 Summer Olympics.

References

External links
 

1971 births
Living people
Athletes (track and field) at the 1996 Summer Olympics
Austrian male middle-distance runners
Olympic athletes of Austria
People from Reutte District